Marcin Pobuta (born 5 August 1975 in Poznań) is a Polish former field hockey goalkeeper who competed in the 2000 Summer Olympics.

References

External links

1975 births
Living people
Polish male field hockey players
Male field hockey goalkeepers
Olympic field hockey players of Poland
1998 Men's Hockey World Cup players
Field hockey players at the 2000 Summer Olympics
2002 Men's Hockey World Cup players
Sportspeople from Poznań